Aglaja may refer to:

An alternative form of Aglaia (given name)
 Aglaja Brix (born 1990), German actress
 Aglaja Orgeni (1841–1926), Hungarian opera singer
 Aglaya, a character in Dostoyevski's novel The Idiot
 Aglaja, 1893 opera by Leo Blech
 Aglaja (dance company), from Bruges, Belgium
 Aglaja (gastropod), a genus of sea slugs
 47 Aglaja, a large main belt asteroid